Francis Wellington Hay (November 17, 1864 – April 1, 1932) was a grain merchant and Canadian politician.

Hay was born in Listowel, Canada West, the son of William G. Hay. He worked for the Federal Bank for three years before entering the family grain business. He was mayor of Listowel from 1903 to 1904. Hay was defeated by James Torrance for a seat in the provincial assembly in 1914; he won a by-election in 1916 and represented the provincial riding of Perth North until 1923. He served as leader of the Ontario Liberal Party in the provincial legislature from 1921 to 1923 but resigned after the one election campaign he led the party through saw the Liberals drop in representation from 27 to 14 seats. In 1926 he was elected to the House of Commons as a member of the Liberal Party but did not run for re-election in 1930.

His uncle David Davidson Hay had previously served in the provincial assembly. His brother J. Nelson Hay also served as mayor of Listowel.

External links 

Listowel, Ontario, Past and Present (1921)
History of Perth County to 1967, WS & HJM Johnston (1967)

1864 births
1932 deaths
Ontario Liberal Party MPPs
Liberal Party of Canada MPs
Members of the House of Commons of Canada from Ontario
Leaders of the Ontario Liberal Party
Mayors of places in Ontario